Carlos José Báez (born 1 November 1953) is a Paraguayan footballer. He played in seven matches for the Paraguay national football team from 1974 to 1977. He was also part of Paraguay's squad for the 1975 Copa América tournament.

References

External links
 

1953 births
Living people
Paraguayan footballers
Paraguay international footballers
Association football forwards
Club Nacional footballers
Cerro Porteño players
UD Salamanca players
Burgos CF (1936) footballers
Paraguayan expatriate footballers
Expatriate footballers in Spain
Paraguayan football managers
Cerro Porteño managers
Club Nacional managers